Turning Season Within is Draconian's fourth studio album. It was released on February 29, 2008 (March 4 in the US), through Napalm Records. This album also features Paul Kuhr from Novembers Doom on the track September Ashes.

The album's main theme is a failed relationship between two lovers.

Track listing

Personnel
Lisa Johansson: vocals
Anders Jacobsson: vocals
Johan Ericson: Lead guitar, Backing vocals
Daniel Arvidsson: Rhythm guitar
Fredrik Johansson: Bass
Jerry Torstensson: Drums, Percussion
Andreas Karlsson (no longer an official member): Additional keyboards, composer of "September Ashes"
Paul Kuhr (of Novembers Doom): Guest vocals & narration on "September Ashes"

Production
Arranged and produced by Draconian
Recorded and engineered by David Castillo and Johan Ornborg
Mixed and mastered by Jens Bogren

References

External links
"Turning Season Within" at discogs.com link

2008 albums
Draconian (band) albums
Napalm Records albums